Loretta Lynn's Greatest Hits is a compilation album by American country music singer-songwriter Loretta Lynn. It was released on June 10, 1968, by Decca Records. The album is made up of Lynn's biggest hits from 1962 to 1967.

Critical reception

The review in the June 22, 1968 issue of Billboard said, "A powerful package. Contains the biggest hits of this great artist. Included are "Don't Come Home a Drinkin'", "Dear Uncle Sam", "You Ain't Woman Enough" and others. Will move right up the charts."

Cashbox also published a review in the June 22 issue. The review said, "From a purely commercial standpoint, this collection of Loretta Lynn giants is destined for a powerhouse reaction from consumers. From the beginning of it all, "Success", to one of her more recent biggies, "If You're Not Gone Too Long", Loretta sings up her usual hurricane, and outdoes herself on a couple of monsters called "You Ain't Woman Enough" and "Don't Come Home a Drinkin'". This one may go through the roof."

Commercial performance 
The album peaked at No. 6 on the US Billboard Hot Country LP's chart. The album became Lynn's second album to receive a Gold certification by the RIAA, which is awarded to an album that has sold 500,000 copies or more.

Track listing

Personnel
Adapted from the album liner notes and Decca recording session records.
Willie Ackerman – drums
Harold Bradley – electric guitar, electric bass guitar
Owen Bradley – producer
David Briggs – piano
Cecil Brower – fiddle
Hal Buksbaum – photography
Floyd Cramer – piano
Ray Edenton – acoustic guitar
Buddy Harman – drums
Don Helms – steel guitar
Junior Huskey – bass
Tommy Jackson – fiddle
The Jordanaires – background vocals
Jerry Kennedy – guitar
Loretta Lynn – lead vocals
Grady Martin – guitar, lead electric guitar
Bob Moore – bass
Harold Morrison – guitar
Wayne Moss – guitar, electric guitar
Jack Pruett – electric guitar
Hal Rugg – steel guitar
Johnny Russell – guitar
Teddy Wilburn – guitar, liner notes
Joe Zinkan – bass

Charts

Certifications

References 

Loretta Lynn compilation albums
Albums produced by Owen Bradley
1968 greatest hits albums
Decca Records compilation albums